M.S. Parthasarathy or M.S.P. Sarathi (28 August 1924 – 29 April 1981) was an Indian film editor, director, and producer. He was closely associated with H.M. Reddy and worked numerous movies with him as an editor. He directed Telugu movie Errakota Veerudu (1973) with  NT Rama Rao in the lead role. He edited Bhakta Kanakadasa (1960), with  Dr. Rajkumar in the lead role which marked the official 100th film in Sandalwood (Kannada) film industry. He also edited Vaddante Dabbu with NT Rama Rao in the lead role.

Parthasarathy also contributed to cross-cultural movies. He had collaborated with director and producer Robin Tampoe with whom he edited numerous films between 1958 and 1960 in Sri Lanka in Sinhala language.

Early years 
Parthasarathy was born in Mylapore, Chennai, India, the eldest son of Annapurani Ammal and M.C. Sada Gopal, Mylapore high school headmaster. He did his schooling at Mylapore Government High School. Due to the family's financial situation during World War II, Parthasarathy began a lifelong career in the film industry, adoring various hats. He started his career as editor when he was 16 yrs old. He was trained on the job. In collaboration with Rohini Pictures he worked in both Tamil and Telugu film industry.

Parthasarathy was well versed in five Indian languages (Tamil, Telugu, Kannada, Malayalam and Hindi) and two international languages (English and Sinhala). He has worked as associate editor and as editor in Tamil, Telugu, Kannada and Sinhala movies. Parthasarathy was the editor of movie Chandralekha (1948). The movie then underwent scripting and filming crew changes, and when the first director TG Raghavachari alias Acharya walked out on the film, Parthasarathy followed him.

Career history 
Parthasarathy was the editor for Niraparadhi  is a 1951 Telugu/Tamil film produced and directed by H. M. Reddy. Mukkamala Krishna Murthy played lead role whereas Anjali Devi played a dual role and Sivaji Ganesan's debut movie as dubbing artist and given his voice to Mukkamala Krishna Murthy for the Tamil version. In collaboration with Rohini Pictures he worked in both Tamil and Telugu film industry, editing note-worthy movies like Gruhalakshmi (1955) and Vaddante Dabbu (1954) He worked as associate editor in the Vanjam (1953) movie, Tamil-language film directed by Y. R. Swamy and produced by M.M Reddy and in movie Panam Paduthum Paadu (1953), produced by H.M Reddy and directed by Y.R Swamy.

Parthasarathy edited the famous, Ondre Kulam (1956)   Tamil-language film produced and directed by N. Krishnaswamy. The film stars R. S. Manohar and Madhuri Devi. This film title was named by former Tamil Nadu Chief Minister K.Kamaraj and it a 1956 award-winning Tamil film. He moved to Sri Lanka to work in cross-cultural movies. He was a pioneer editor in Sri Lankan films. In collaboration with Robin Tampoe he edited a Sinhala-language film, Sepali (1958), Srimali (1959). He worked in the Sri Lankan Sinhala-language film, produced by P.L Buddhadasa and Mina Tampoe.

Director and producer 
Parthasarathy directed the Telugu blockbuster movie, Errakota veeradu (1973). with Actor NT Rama Rao and Actress Savithri in the lead role. The movie, 'Kataya Kalyanam' in Tamil, with Actor Sivakumar in lead role along with Kumari Padmini and Srividya was directed and produced by Parthasarathy. Unfortunately, the movie didn't make it to the silver screen due to health and financial constraints.

Partial filmography

References 

1924 births
1981 deaths
Indian film editors
Film directors from Chennai
Film producers from Chennai